The Dornier Do 19 was a German four-engine heavy bomber that first flew on 28 October 1936. Only one prototype flew, and it was converted to a transport in 1938. The other two were scrapped.

The Luftwaffe had a shortcoming in the lack of an efficient heavy bomber fleet. Generalleutnant Walther Wever, the Luftwaffes first Chief of Staff, was the most persistent advocate of a German long-range strategic bomber fleet. It was built for the Luftwaffes Ural bomber program under General Wever, competing against the Junkers Ju 89. The RLM Technisches Amt issued a specification for a four-engine heavy bomber. But after Wever's  death in an airplane crash in June 1936, Wever's successor, Albert Kesselring, canceled Germany's long-range bomber projects to concentrate on tactical bombers.

Both Dornier and Junkers were competitors for the contract, and each received an order for three prototypes in late 1935. The Dornier design was given the project number Do 19, while the Junkers prototype became the Ju 89.

Design and development

The Dornier Do 19 was a mid-wing cantilever design, and was mostly metal in construction. It had a rectangular-section fuselage and the tail had braced twin fins and rudders, mounted on the upper surface of the tailplane, itself set low on the rear fuselage. This was quite similar to the tail of the contemporary British Armstrong Whitworth Whitley medium bomber. It also had retractable landing gear, including the tailwheel. The powerplant, according to some sources, was supposed to be four Bramo 322H-2 radial engines that were mounted in nacelles at the leading edges of the wings.

It had a crew of ten, which would have consisted of a pilot, co-pilot, navigator, bombardier, radio operator and five gunners.
The V1 prototype flew on 28 October 1936. After Generalleutnant Wever died in an airplane crash on 3 June 1936, the heavy bomber program lost its momentum, and never recovered. When the Luftwaffe was given its heavy blow over the skies of England, the error of not having heavy bombers became apparent. By then, however, it was too late to develop the bombers required.

Albert Kesselring, Wever's successor, believed that what Germany required were more fighters and tactical bombers. 

Also Kesselring and Jeschonnek had suggested to Göring that it would be better to drop heavy bomber projects due to material shortages. Around 2.5 tactical bombers could be built with the same material as one heavy bomber. In May 1937 Göring is reported as saying to Milch ‘The Führer does not ask me how big my bombers are, but how many there are’ 

Therefore, the V2 and V3 prototypes were scrapped. The original V1 became a transport in 1938. The Dornier Do 19 had a disappointing performance: it was slow, carried only a 1,600 kg bombload, and had only medium range. In fact, the whole Ural bomber concept had already been abandoned, not only because the required range was impossible, but also because existing navigation and bombsights were not up to the task.

Specifications (Do 19 V2)

See also

References

External links

WW2 in Color

 

Abandoned military aircraft projects of Germany
Do 019
1930s German bomber aircraft
1930s German military transport aircraft
Four-engined tractor aircraft
Mid-wing aircraft
World War II heavy bombers of Germany
Aircraft first flown in 1936
Four-engined piston aircraft